Smith Mountain Dam is a concrete arch dam located on the Roanoke River in Virginia, creating Smith Mountain Lake. The dam was built by Appalachian Power (a division of American Electric Power) between 1960 and 1963 for the purposes of pumped-storage hydroelectricity. The dam created Smith Mountain Lake as its reservoir, where recreation and real estate have become popular.

History
In the late 1920s, Appalachian Power began purchasing land and planning for a hydroelectricity dam within the Smith Mountain Gorge that is split by the Roanoke River. After several delays and the completion of engineering studies, construction began in 1960. Construction on the smaller Leesville Dam also began downstream at this time as well. Concrete pouring began in 1961 and in 1962, the re-construction of roads and bridges that would be affected by the reservoir was complete.

Filling of the reservoir, Smith Mountain Lake, began on September 24, 1963. In 1964, the first four hydro-electrical generators were installed.

On March 7, 1966, the reservoir was full.

Hydroelectric production
Smith Mountain Dam houses five hydroelectric generators with a combined installed capacity of 560 MW. Smith Mountain Lake Dam uses pumped-storage hydroelectricity by which water that is released downstream can be pumped back into Smith Mountain Lake for re-use. The Leesville Dam regulates the Smith Mountain Lake's outflows and stores water to be pumped back into the Smith Mountain Lake for this purpose. Hydro-electricity is usually produced during high-demand times (day) and pumped back into the lake during low demand times (night). The Leesville Dam also produces hydro-electricity as well.

In December 2009, The U.S. Federal Energy Regulatory Commission granted Appalachian Power a new license to operate the hydro-electricity plant. The new 30-year license replaces the original 50-year license and also addresses recreational and environmental management.

References

External links 

 Smith Mountain Project at American Electric Power
 Smith Mountain Lake Website
 AEP - Smith Mountain Lake Reservoir Levels

Dams completed in 1963
Energy infrastructure completed in 1963
Buildings and structures in Bedford County, Virginia
Dams in Virginia
Hydroelectric power plants in Virginia
Buildings and structures in Pittsylvania County, Virginia
Pumped-storage hydroelectric power stations in the United States
Arch dams
United States power company dams
1963 establishments in Virginia
American Electric Power